La Cangreja National Park, until 2002 the Cerro de la Cangreja Protected Zone, is a National Park in the Puriscal Canton of San José Province, in west-central Costa Rica.

It is a part of the Central Pacific Conservation Area, near the Pacific Ocean coast.

See also
 National parks of Costa Rica
 San José Province

References

External links 
 La Iguana Chocolate — Costa Rican owned chocolate farm next to the park. 
 Rancho Mastatal Sustainability Education Center

National parks of Costa Rica
Geography of San José Province
Protected areas established in 1987
Tourist attractions in San José Province